Hradec Králové District is a district in the Hradec Králové Region of the Czech Republic. Its capital is the city of Hradec Králové.

Administrative division
Hradec Králové District is divided into two administrative districts of municipalities with extended competence: Hradec Králové and Nový Bydžov.

List of municipalities
Cities and towns are marked in bold:

Babice –
Barchov –
Běleč nad Orlicí –
Benátky –
Blešno –
Boharyně –
Černilov –
Černožice –
Chlumec nad Cidlinou –
Chudeřice –
Čistěves –
Divec –
Dobřenice –
Dohalice –
Dolní Přím –
Habřina –
Hlušice –
Hněvčeves –
Holohlavy –
Hořiněves –
Hradec Králové –
Hrádek –
Humburky –
Hvozdnice –
Jeníkovice –
Jílovice –
Káranice –
Klamoš –
Kobylice –
Kosice –
Kosičky –
Králíky –
Kratonohy –
Kunčice –
Ledce –
Lejšovka –
Lhota pod Libčany –
Libčany –
Libníkovice –
Librantice –
Libřice –
Lišice –
Lochenice –
Lodín –
Lovčice –
Lužany –
Lužec nad Cidlinou –
Máslojedy –
Měník –
Mlékosrby –
Mokrovousy –
Myštěves –
Mžany –
Neděliště –
Nechanice –
Nepolisy –
Nové Město –
Nový Bydžov –
Obědovice –
Ohnišťany –
Olešnice –
Osice –
Osičky –
Petrovice –
Písek –
Prasek –
Praskačka –
Předměřice nad Labem –
Převýšov –
Pšánky –
Puchlovice –
Račice nad Trotinou –
Radíkovice –
Radostov –
Roudnice –
Sadová –
Šaplava –
Sendražice –
Skalice –
Skřivany –
Sloupno –
Smidary –
Smiřice –
Smržov –
Sovětice –
Stará Voda –
Starý Bydžov –
Stěžery –
Stračov –
Střezetice –
Světí –
Syrovátka –
Těchlovice –
Třebechovice pod Orebem –
Třesovice –
Urbanice –
Vinary –
Vrchovnice –
Všestary –
Výrava –
Vysoká nad Labem –
Vysoký Újezd –
Zachrašťany –
Zdechovice –

Demographics

Most populated municipalities

Economy
The largest employers with its headquarters in Hradec Králové District and at least 500 employers are:

Transport
The D11 motorway (part of the European route E67), which leads from Prague to Hradec Králové and continues to the Czech-Polish border, passes through the district.

Sights

The most important monuments in the district, protected as national cultural monuments, are:
Museum of Eastern Bohemia
Chapel of the Epiphany in Smiřice
Probošt's mechanical Christmas crib
Hrádek u Nechanic Castle

The best-preserved settlements and landscapes, protected as monument reservations and monument zones, are:
Hradec Králové (includes both a monument reservation and a monument zone)
Nový Bydžov
Libeň
Vysočany
Battlefield of the Battle of Königgrätz

The most visited tourist destinations are the Hrádek u Nechanic Castle and White Tower in Hradec Králové.

References

External links

Hradec Králové District profile on the Czech Statistical Office's website

 
Districts of the Czech Republic